Noagaon is the name of several local divisions and villages in Bangladesh:

Noagaon Union, Brahmanbaria and Noagaon, Sarail (a village within it)
Noagaon Union, Lakshmipur
Noagaon Union, Narayanganj